Little Lake (Nova Scotia) could mean the following :

Lakes

Antigonish County

Little Lake at 
Little Lake at

Cape Breton Regional Municipality

Little Lake at 
Little Lake at 
Little Lake at

Colchester County

Little Lake at 
Little Lake at 
Little Lake at

Cumberland County

Little Lake at

Digby County

Little Lake at 
Little Lake Doucette at

Guysborough County

Little Lake at 
Little Lake at 
Little Lake at 
Little Lake at 
Little Lake at 
Little Lake at 
Little Lake at 
Little Lake at 
Little Lake at

Halifax Regional Municipality

Little Lake at 
Long Lake at 
Little Lake at 
Little Lake at 
Little Lake at 
Little Lake at 
Little Lake at 
Little Lake at 
Little Lake at 
Little Lake at 
Little Lake at 
Little Lake at 
Little Lake at 
Little Lake at 
Little Lake at 
Little Lake at 
Little Lake at 
Little Lake at 
Little Lake at 
Little Lake at 
Little Lake at 
Little Lake at 
Little Lake No Good at

Kings County

Little Lake at 
Little Lake at

Pictou County

Little Lake at

Region of Queens Municipality

Little Lake at

Lunenburg County

Little Lake at 
Little Lake at 
Little Lake at

Richmond County

Little Lake at 
Little Lake at

Shelburne County

Little Lake at 
Little Lake at

Victoria County

Little Lake at

Yarmouth County

Little Lake at 
Little Lake at 
Little Lake at

Rivers

Little Lake Brook in Region of Queens Municipality at 
Little Lake Brook in Kings County at

References
Geographical Names Board of Canada
Explore HRM
Nova Scotia Placenames

Lakes of Nova Scotia
Lakes, Little Lake
Nova Scotia